Promesas de arena is a Spanish limited television series starring Andrea Duro, Daniel Grao, Blanca Portillo and Francesco Arca. Produced by RTVE in collaboration with Atlantia Media, the adventure and romance television series is based on the namesake novel by Laura Garzón. It originally aired in 2019 on La 1.

Premise 
Featuring the world of international aid as backdrop, the plot of the series begins with Lucía travelling to a hospital managed by the fictional NGO 'Acción Global' located in the Libyan desert which is led by Andy (Daniel Grao) and Julia (Blanca Portillo). A love story develops between Lucía and Hayzam (Francesco Arca), the man responsible for providing the supplies to the hospital yet also living a double life as weapon trafficker.

The series is set in the fictional Libyan city of Fursa.

Cast 
 Andrea Duro as Lucía.
 Daniel Grao as Andy.
  as Hayzam.
 Blanca Portillo as Julia.
  as Jaime.
 Thaïs Blume as Berta.
  as Diego.

Production and release 

Based on the namesake novel by Laura Garzón, Promesas de arena was produced by RTVE in collaboration with Atlantia Media. The 3-month-long filming took place in Tunisia and Spain; scenes were shot in the Sfax harbour and the Tozeur oasis, whereas the rest of the filming took place in Madrid. It consisted of six episodes.

The script is authored by Ignasi Rubio and Guadalupe Rilova, based on the plot by Laura Garzón and Ignasi Rubio. Joaquín Llamas and Manuel Estudillo directed the series.

The original musical score is a work by Pablo Cervantes.

The first episode began airing on 11 November 2019 in prime time on La 1, TVE's flagship channel, attracting 1,585,000 viewers (10.5% share). The viewership remained stable albeit unimpressive throughout the broadcasting run.

Awards and nominations 

|-
| align = "center" rowspan = 2 | 2021 || rowspan = 2 | 22nd Iris Awards || colspan = " 2" | Best Fiction ||  || rowspan = "2" | 
|-
| Best Actress || Blanca Portillo || 
|}

References 

Television shows set in Libya
Television shows filmed in Spain
Television shows filmed in Tunisia
2019 Spanish television series debuts
2019 Spanish television series endings
La 1 (Spanish TV channel) network series
Television series based on Spanish novels
2010s romance television series
Spanish-language television shows
Spanish adventure television series
Spanish television miniseries
2010s Spanish drama television series